Jim Jacumin (born November 15, 1936) is an American politician who served in the North Carolina Senate from the 44th district from 2005 to 2011.

References

External links

1936 births
Living people
Republican Party North Carolina state senators
Place of birth missing (living people)